Herbert Evelyn Vigar (29 November 1883 – 27 October 1946) was an English footballer from 1898 to 1904, and a first-class cricketer active from 1906 to 1911 who played for Surrey. He was born and died in Redhill. He played as a wicket-keeper, and served as understudy to Herbert Strudwick.

Football career
Vigar "had a distinguished career both as a cricketer and a footballer", though he was noted to have "made the greatest name for himself" as a cricketer. Vigar first played football for Redhill Star, where his brother Fred was a prominent member of the team. At the age of 15, Vigar joined the team, which had just lost four straight matches, and helped lead them to a win over a strong opponent. He was nicknamed "the Midget", a name which followed him in his career. An 1899 game report noted that Vigar was "as good as ever on the left, notwithstanding the close attention paid [him]. It was by splendid work that the Star 'midget' scored the only goal of the match". Turning professional, Vigar played for Wales, and then for several seasons for Norwich City F.C.. He retired from the football due to ankle injuries from a Southern League match at Brighton.

Cricket career
In 1904, Vigar switched from football to cricket, and was "given a trial at the Oval", where he was named captain of one of the trial teams. Though his team lost, "Vigar stood up to all the bowling in capital style and quite pleased the authorities by his display behind the sticks". On September 6, 1910, Vigar married Alice J. Smith; reporting of the marriage noted Vigar's popularity as a cricketer. The following year, Vigar began the cricket season with a strong game that was lauded in the sporting news:

Death
Vigar died in the Royal Earlswood Institution for Mental Defectives, at the age of 62.

References

1883 births
1946 deaths
English cricketers
Surrey cricketers
Wicket-keepers
People from Redhill, Surrey
Norwich City F.C. players